José Ignacio Cárdenas (1874 – 13 September 1949) was a Venezuelan physician and diplomat. From 1910 to 1925 he acted as a roving Venezuelan diplomat in Europe, particularly in France, Holland, and Spain, and made reports on the activities of Venezuelan exiles, including (after returning to Europe in 1929) Román Delgado Chalbaud's Falke expedition. He received the Grand Cross of Spain's Order of Isabella the Catholic in 1921.

References

1874 births
1949 deaths
People from Táchira
20th-century Venezuelan physicians
Venezuelan diplomats
Recipients of the Order of Isabella the Catholic
Ambassadors of Venezuela to Spain